Vladimirovka is a rural locality (a selo) in Vladimirovsky Selsoviet of Yenotayevsky District, Astrakhan Oblast, Russia. The population was 910 as of 2010. There are 13 streets.

Geography 
Vladimirovka is located 12 km south of Yenotayevka (the district's administrative centre) by road. Vostok is the nearest rural locality.

References 

Rural localities in Yenotayevsky District